The 1965 NCAA College Division basketball tournament involved 32 schools playing in a single-elimination tournament to determine the national champion of men's NCAA College Division college basketball as a culmination of the 1964–65 NCAA College Division men's basketball season. It was won by the University of Evansville, with Evansville's Jerry Sloan named the Most Outstanding Player for the second consecutive year.

Regional participants

Regionals

Mideast - Akron, Ohio
Location: Memorial Hall Host: Municipal University of Akron

Third Place - Steubenville 94, Randolph–Macon 68

New England - Syracuse, New York
Location: Henninger Athletic Center Host: Le Moyne College
{{4TeamBracket
| RD1=Regional semifinalsRound of 32March 5
| RD2=Regional finalSweet 16March 6
 | RD1-seed1=
 | RD1-team1=St. Michael's
 | RD1-score1=77
 | RD1-seed2=
 | RD1-team2=Hartwick
 | RD1-score2=72
 | RD1-seed3=
 | RD1-team3=Assumption
 | RD1-score3=76
 | RD1-seed4=
 | RD1-team4=Le Moyne
 | RD1-score4=58
 | RD2-seed1=
 | RD2-team1=St. Michael's
 | RD2-score1=83 | RD2-seed2=
 | RD2-team2=Assumption
 | RD2-score2=76
}}
Third Place - Hartwick 70, Le Moyne 68

South Central - Louisville, KentuckyLocation: Knights Hall Host: Bellarmine College

Third Place - Norfolk State 91, Bethune–Cookman 74

East - Reading, PennsylvaniaLocation: Bollman Center Host: Albright College

Third Place - Cheyney 52, Albright 51

Midwest - Grand Forks, North DakotaLocation: Hyslop Sports Center Host: University of North Dakota

Third Place - Minnesota–Duluth 86, Colorado State College 58

Pacific Coast - Seattle, WashingtonLocation: Royal Brougham Pavilion Host: Seattle Pacific University

Third Place - San Francisco State 85, Nevada Southern 78

Great Lakes - Carbondale, IllinoisLocation: SIU Arena Host: Southern Illinois University

Third Place - Jackson State 90, Concordia 80

Southwest - Warrensburg, MissouriLocation: CMSU Fieldhouse Host: Central Missouri State University

Third Place - Central Missouri State 105, Doane 52

*denotes each overtime played

National Finals - Evansville, IndianaLocation: Roberts Municipal Stadium Host:''' Evansville College

Third Place - North Dakota 94, St. Michael's 86

*denotes each overtime played

All-tournament team
 Walt Frazier (Southern Illinois)
 Larry Humes (Evansville)
 George McNeil (Southern Illinois)
 Jerry Sloan (Evansville)
 Richard Tarrant (Saint Michael's)

See also
 1965 NCAA University Division basketball tournament
 1965 NAIA Basketball Tournament

References

Sources
 2010 NCAA Men's Basketball Championship Tournament Records and Statistics: Division II men's basketball Championship
 1965 NCAA College Division Men's Basketball Tournament jonfmorse.com

NCAA Division II men's basketball tournament
Tournament
NCAA College Division basketball tournament
NCAA College Division basketball tournament